Peter Benson may refer to:

Peter Benson (author) (born 1956), British novelist
Peter Benson (actor) (1943–2018), British actor known for his role in the TV series Heartbeat
Peter Benson (rugby league) (born 1967), Australian rugby league footballer of the 1980s and 1990s
Peter L. Benson (1946–2011), American psychologist